Hotel Manhattan (also known as Manhattan Hotel) was a "railroad hotel" on the northwest corner of Madison Avenue and 42nd Street in Manhattan, New York City, New York.

History 
Built in 1895–1896, it was to an 1893 design by Henry Janeway Hardenbergh. Architectural features included three levels of dormers and a chateuesque roof. It was razed in 1961 to make way for an office tower. Built by Marc Eidlitz & Son, there were 16.5 stories, with 14 stories above the street level. The electrical contractor was C. L. Eidlitz. The fixtures, to a design by Hardenbergh, were manufactured by the Archer Pancoast Company. The hotel was opened under the proprietorship of Hawk & Wetherbee.

In September 1957, the unrelated Hotel Lincoln at 700 Eighth Avenue was remodeled and renamed as the Manhattan Hotel. In 1958, an enormous, illuminated letter "M"—31 feet wide and 12 feet deep—was added to the roof of the former Hotel Lincoln.

Architecture and fittings

References

External links

1896 establishments in New York City
1961 disestablishments in New York (state)
42nd Street (Manhattan)
Baroque Revival architecture in New York City
Buildings and structures demolished in 1961
Defunct hotels in Manhattan
Demolished buildings and structures in Manhattan
Demolished hotels in New York City
Former skyscrapers
Henry Janeway Hardenbergh buildings
Hotels disestablished in 1961
Hotels established in 1896
Madison Avenue
Midtown Manhattan
Railway hotels in the United States
Skyscraper hotels in Manhattan
Demolished hotels